Joseph Rao Kony (likely born 1961) is a Ugandan militant who founded the Lord's Resistance Army (LRA), a Christian fundamentalist organization, designated as a terrorist group by the United Nations Peacekeepers, the European Union and various other governments.

An Acholi, Kony was born into a middle-class family. Kony's father Luizi Obol and his mother Nora Oting were both farmers. Kony dropped out of school at a young age. In 1987, he formed the Lord's Resistance Army. Kony declared a military offensive in Uganda, aiming to overthrow Yoweri Museveni's Ugandan government and establish a theocratic state based on the dominion theology. After Kony's terror activities, he was banished from Uganda, and shifted to South Sudan. Kony described himself as a freedom fighter, struggling for a Christian Uganda.

Kony has long been one of Africa's most notorious warlords. He is currently one of the most wanted African militants as well. He has been accused by government entities of ordering the abduction of children to become child soldiers and sex slaves. Approximately 66,000 children became soldiers, and 2 million people were displaced internally from 1986 to 2009 by his forces. Kony was indicted in 2005 for war crimes and crimes against humanity by the International Criminal Court (ICC) in The Hague, but he has evaded capture. He has been subject to an Interpol Red Notice at the request of the ICC since 2006. Since the Juba peace talks in 2006, the Lord's Resistance Army no longer operates in Uganda. Sources claim that they are in the Democratic Republic of the Congo (DRC), the Central African Republic (CAR), or South Sudan. In 2013, Kony was reported to be in poor health, and Michel Djotodia, president of the CAR, claimed he was negotiating with Kony to surrender.

, Kony was still at large, but his force was reported to have shrunk to approximately 100 soldiers, down from an estimated high of 3,000. Both the United States and Uganda ended the hunt for Kony and the LRA, believing that the LRA was no longer a significant security risk to Uganda.

Biography

Early life
Kony was likely born in 1961, in Odek, a village east of Gulu in northern Uganda, to farmers Luizi Obol and Nora Oting. He is a member of the Acholi people. He was either the youngest or second youngest of six children in the family. Kony enjoyed a good relationship with his siblings, but was quick to retaliate in a dispute and when confronted would often resort to physical violence. His father was a lay catechist of the Catholic Church, and his mother was an Anglican. His older sister, Gabriela Lakot, still lives in Odek.

Kony never finished elementary school. He was an altar boy until 1976. He dropped out of school at age 15.

Rebel leader
In 1995, Kony rose to prominence in Acholiland after the Holy Spirit Movement of Alice Auma (also known as Lakwena and to whom Kony is believed to be related). The overthrow of Acholi President Tito Okello by Yoweri Museveni and his National Resistance Army (NRA) during the Ugandan Bush War (1981–1986) had culminated in mass looting of livestock, rape, burning of homes, genocide, and murder by Museveni's army. 

The acts committed by the Museveni's NRA, now known as the Uganda People's Defence Force, led to the creation of the LRA by Joseph Kony. The insurgencies gave rise to concentration camps in northern Uganda where over 2 million people were confined. The government burned people's properties using helicopter gunships, killing many. There were forced displacements in the northern region. International campaigns called for all camps to be dismantled, and for the people to return to their former villages.

In 2006, in the Juba peace talks with the LRA rebels, Museveni's government gave permission for the local people to return to their villages. This marked the beginning of the rehabilitation of homes, roads, and so on.

Lord's Resistance Army

Kony has been implicated in abduction and recruitment of child soldiers. The LRA have had battle confrontations with the government's NRA or UPDF within Uganda and in South Sudan for ten years. In 2008 the Ugandan army invaded the DRC in search for the LRA in Operation Lightning Thunder. In November 2013, Kony was reported to be in poor health in the eastern CAR town of Nzoka. 

Looking back at the LRA's campaign of violence, The Guardian stated in 2015 that Kony's forces had been responsible for the deaths of over 100,000 and the abduction of at least 60,000 children. Various atrocities committed include raping young girls and abducting them for use as sex slaves.

The actual number of LRA militia members has varied significantly over the years, reaching as high as 3000 soldiers. By 2017, the organization's membership had shrunk significantly to an estimated 100 soldiers. In April 2017, both the US and Ugandan governments ended efforts to find Kony and fight the LRA, stating that the LRA no longer posed a significant security risk to Uganda.

While initially purporting to fight against government oppression, the LRA allegedly turned against Kony's own supporters, supposedly to "purify" the Acholi people and turn Uganda into a theocracy. Kony proclaims himself the spokesperson of God and a spirit medium and claims he is visited by a multinational host of 13 spirits, including a Chinese phantom. Ideologically, the group is a syncretic mix of mysticism, Acholi nationalism, and heterodox Christian fundamentalism, and claims to be establishing a theocratic state based on the Ten Commandments and local Acholi tradition.

Indictment

In October 2006, the ICC announced that arrest warrants had been issued for five members of the Lord's Resistance Army for crimes against humanity following a sealed indictment. On the next day, Ugandan defense minister Amama Mbabazi revealed that the warrants include Kony, his deputy Vincent Otti, and LRA commanders Raska Lukwiya, Okot Odhiambo, and Dominic Ongwen. The Ugandan army killed Lukwiya on 12 August 2006. 

The BBC received information that Otti had been killed on 2 October 2007, at Kony's home. In November 2006, Kony met Jan Egeland, the UN Under-Secretary-General for Humanitarian Affairs and Emergency Relief Coordinator. Journeyman Pictures released a 2006 interview with Kony in which he proclaims: "I am a freedom fighter, not a terrorist." He told Reuters: "We don't have any children. We only have combatants."

Religious beliefs
Kony's followers, as well as some detractors, believe he is possessed by spirits. Kony tells his child soldiers that a cross on their chest drawn in oil will protect them from bullets. He is a proponent of polygamy, and is thought to have had 60 wives, and to have fathered 42 children. Kony insists that he and the LRA are fighting for the Ten Commandments, and defended his actions in an interview, saying, "Is it bad? It is not against human rights. And that commandment was not given by Joseph. It was not given by LRA. No, those commandments were given by God."

Ugandan political leader Betty Bigombe recalled that Kony and his followers used oil to ward off bullets and evil spirits. Kony believes himself to be a spirit medium. In 2008, responding to a request by Ugandan President Yoweri Museveni to engage in peace talks via telephone, he said, "I will communicate with Museveni through the holy spirits and not through the telephone." 

During peace talks in 1994, Kony was preceded by men in robes sprinkling holy water. According to Francis Ongom, a former LRA officer who defected, Kony "has found Bible justifications for killing witches, for killing [those who farm or eat] pigs because of the story of the Gadarene swine, and for killing [other] people because God did the same with Noah's flood and Sodom and Gomorrah."

Action against Kony

Uganda
Before the insurgency, he escaped in 1989 to Uganda. He was later captured by the Ugandan government. He was released in 1992 after the government no longer viewed him as a threat.

The Ugandan military has attempted to kill Kony throughout the insurgency. In Uganda's attempt to track down Kony, former LRA combatants have been enlisted to search remote areas of the CAR, Sudan, and the DRC where he was last seen.

United States
After the September 11 attacks, the United States designated the LRA as a terrorist group. In August 2008, the US Department of State declared Joseph Kony a Specially Designated Global Terrorist pursuant to Executive Order 13224, a designation that carries financial and other penalties. In November 2008, U.S. President George W. Bush signed the directive to the United States Africa Command to provide financial and logistical assistance to the Ugandan government during the unsuccessful 2008–2009 Garamba offensive, code-named Operation Lightning Thunder.

No U.S. troops were directly involved. 17 U.S. advisers and analysts provided intelligence, equipment, and fuel to Ugandan military counterparts. The offensive pushed Kony from his jungle camp, but he was not captured. One hundred children were rescued. 

In May 2010, U.S. President Barack Obama signed into law the Lord's Resistance Army Disarmament and Northern Uganda Recovery Act, legislation aimed at stopping Kony and the LRA. The bill passed unanimously in the United States Senate on 11 March. On 12 May 2010, a motion to suspend the rules and pass the bill was agreed to by voice vote (two-thirds being in the affirmative) in the House of Representatives. In November 2010, President Obama delivered a strategy document to Congress asking for more funding to disarm Kony and the LRA.

In October 2011, President Obama authorized the deployment of approximately 100 combat-equipped U.S. troops to central Africa. Their goal is to help regional forces remove Kony and senior LRA leaders from the battlefield. In a letter to Congress, Obama stated: "Although the U.S. forces are combat-equipped, they will only be providing information, advice, and assistance to partner nation forces, and they will not themselves engage LRA forces unless necessary for self-defense". On 3 April 2013, the Obama administration offered rewards of up to US$5 million for information leading to the arrest, transfer, or conviction of Kony, Ongwen, and Odhiambo. On 24 March 2014, the U.S. announced they would deploy at least four CV-22 Ospreys and refuelling planes, and 150 Air Force special forces personnel to assist in the capture of Kony.

African Union
On 23 March 2012, the African Union announced its intentions to "send 5,000 soldiers to join the hunt for rebel leader Joseph Kony" and to "neutralize" him while isolating the scattered LRA groups responsible for 2,600 civilian killings since 2008. This international task force was stated to include soldiers "from Uganda, South Sudan, Central African Republic and Congo, countries where Kony's reign of terror has been felt over the years." Prior to this announcement, the hunt for Kony had primarily been carried out by troops from Uganda. The soldiers began their search in South Sudan on 24 March 2012, and the search "will last until Kony is caught".

Kony 2012

Joseph Kony and the LRA received a surge of attention in early March 2012, when a 30-minute documentary titled Kony 2012 by US filmmaker Jason Russell for the campaign group Invisible Children, Inc. was released. The intention of the production was to draw attention to Kony in an effort to increase US involvement in the issue and have Kony arrested by the end of 2012. 

A poll suggested that more than half of young adult Americans heard about Kony 2012 in the days following the video's release. Several weeks after the release of the video, a resolution condemning Kony and supporting US assistance fighting the LRA was introduced in the US Senate, passing several months later. Kony 2012 has been criticized for simplifying the history of the LRA conflict, and for failing to note that Kony was already pushed out of Uganda six years before the film was made.

Surrender of Ongwen
Dominic Ongwen served as a key member of the LRA and constituted one of Kony's senior aides in the organization. Kidnapped as a child, he became a soldier in the LRA, then rose through the organization's hierarchy. Ongwen surrendered himself to representatives of the CAR in January 2015, which was a major blow to Kony's group. Ugandan army spokesman Paddy Ankunda stated that the event "puts the LRA in the most vulnerable position" and that it "is only Kony left standing".

Of the five LRA commanders charged by the ICC in 2004, only Kony remained at large at that time. With only a few hundred fighters remaining loyal to him, it was mistakenly thought that he would be unable to evade capture for much longer. In February 2021, Ongwen was convicted by the International Criminal Court of 61 counts of crimes against humanity and war crimes.

LRA neutralization and U.S. stand-down
In April 2017, Ugandan and US military forces ended their hunt for Kony and his group, with a Ugandan spokesperson stating that "the LRA no longer poses a threat to us as Uganda". At that time, his force was estimated to have shrunk to around 100 soldiers.

Current Whereabouts

As of 2022, Kony is believed to be hiding in the Darfur region of Sudan where he continues to give orders to his fighters. He was previously provided with armed and logistical support from former president Omar al Bashir

See also

 International Criminal Court investigations
 Lord's Resistance Army insurgency
 List of fugitives from justice who disappeared
 Child soldiers in the Democratic Republic of the Congo

References

Bibliography

External links

 Hague Justice Portal: Joseph Kony
 Joseph Kony on Interpol's wanted list
 Kevin - Documentary on LRA's aftermath in Northern Uganda

1961 births
Acholi people
Fugitives wanted by the International Criminal Court
Fugitives wanted on crimes against humanity charges
Fugitives wanted on war crimes charges
Individuals designated as terrorists by the United States government
Living people
Lord's Resistance Army rebels
People from Gulu District